Paraisaria is a genus of fungi in the Ophiocordycipitaceae family. Members are anamorph names of Ophiocordyceps.

References

External links

Hypocreales genera
Ophiocordycipitaceae
Taxa described in 1983